The Expert is a 1995 American action thriller film about an ex-special forces trainer who decides to exact revenge on the murderer of his sister after his death sentence is commuted. The film was directed by Rick Avery and William Lustig (who was uncredited) and stars Jeff Speakman, Jim Varney and James Brolin.

Plot
John Lomax is an ex-Special Forces trainer whose sister is attacked and murdered by serial killer Martin Kagan. Kagan represents himself at trial, calling in testimony from Dr. Alice Barnes that the murders were committed by Martin Mirman, one of Martin Kagan's other personalities. He is nevertheless sentenced to electrocution. John Lomax breaks into the prison where Kagan is being held to seek his own justice at the same time that Kagan is conducting a prison break of his own.

Cast

Production
Larry Cohen did some uncredited work on the script. He later recalled:
I only did a little work on The Expert. My daughter, Jill Gatsby, wrote that movie. I just got the job for her, that’s all. I really had nothing to do with the film, so I couldn’t comment on it. I saw The Expert, but I don’t remember much. I thought it was passable. The movie was supposed to be a remake of Brute Force but it wasn’t very good. Once again, somebody fucked around with the script.

References

External links
 
 

1995 films
1995 action thriller films
1995 crime thriller films
American crime thriller films
American action thriller films
1990s English-language films
1990s American films